Rosewood, California may refer to:
 Rosewood, Humboldt County, California
 Rosewood, Tehama County, California